is a Japanese former professional footballer who played as a goalkeeper. He played for the Japan national team.

He played for several clubs, including Bellmare Hiratsuka, Avispa Fukuoka and Thespa Kusatsu. He played for the Japan national team (4 matches) and was a participant at the 1998 World Cup.

Club career
Kojima started playing football when he was in the 5th grade and was converted to a goalkeeper at high school. After graduating from Doshisha University in 1988, Kojima joined Fujita Industries (later Bellmare Hiratsuka) playing in the Japan Soccer League Division 1. He became a regular starting member of the team in 1994. He had been playing for the club as an employee of Fujita Industries but turned professional in January 1995.

At the end of 1998, Bellmare released their main players including Kojima as well as Wagner Lopes, Hong Myung-bo, Kazuaki Tasaka and Yoshihiro Natsuka due to their financial problems. Kojima moved to Avispa Fukuoka. He further moved to Thespa Kusatsu in 2002 that played in the Gunma Prefectural League division 2. As a player - assistant coach, he was instrumental in the team's promotion to the Japan Football League, then J2 League. His last competitive game was against Consadole Sapporo on December 3, 2005 and he announced his retirement from the game in January 2006.

International career
In January 1995, Kojima was selected by the Japan national team for the 1995 King Fahd Cup, but did not play any game in the tournament. He played on June 6, 1995 against Brazil in the Umbro Cup. He played four games for Japan until 1996. He was in the squad for the 1996 AFC Asian Cup and 1998 FIFA World Cup as reserve goalkeeper but did not play any game in the tournament.

After retirement
Kojima is currently an advisor for Kusatsu. He also serves as a pundit for NHK, as of February 2010.

Career statistics

Club

International

References

External links
 
 
 Japan National Football Team Database
 

1966 births
Living people
Doshisha University alumni
Association football people from Gunma Prefecture
Japanese footballers
Japan international footballers
Japan Soccer League players
J1 League players
J2 League players
Japan Football League (1992–1998) players
Japan Football League players
Shonan Bellmare players
Avispa Fukuoka players
Thespakusatsu Gunma players
1995 King Fahd Cup players
1996 AFC Asian Cup players
1998 FIFA World Cup players
Association football goalkeepers